Gomidas Keumurdjian (Armenian: Կոմիտաս  Քէօմիւրճեան) (c. 1656- 5 November 1707) known as Cosma de Carbognano was a priest of the Armenian Apostolic Church and later a convert to the Armenian Catholic Church, He is regarded by the Roman Catholic Church as a martyr and is venerated as a Blessed.

Life
Gomidas Keumurdjian was born in Constantinople, the son of an Armenian priest. He was married at about the age of twenty and had seven children. Like his father, he too became a parish priest of the Armenian Apostolic Church. At the age of forty, he and his family converted to Catholicism. A number of his colleagues followed his example.  

There was, at the time, some among the various Orthodox minorities who favored a reunion with Rome. This prompted a strong anti-Catholic backlash. 

In April 1707, he was arrested on charges of inciting a riot among the Armenians. He remained in prison, where he was offered his freedom if he would convert to Islam. Having refused, he was beheaded on 5 November 1707.

Veneration
On 1929, Pope Pius XI beatified Gomidas Keumurdjian as the Blessed and his feast day is celebrated every year on 5 November.

One of his sons, Jean de Carbognano (c.1706-1763), as an orphan, was taken in and educated by latin missionnaires. He entered the service of the kingdom of Naples as a drogman. His own son, Cosimo de Carbognano (1749-1807), entered the service of the kingdom of Naples and later of the kingdom of Spain and became Knight of the Order of the Golden Spur. He published in Latin the principles of Turkish grammar for the use of apostolic missionaries in Constantinople. 

"In Constantinople, Blessed Gomidas Keumurdjan (Cosma da Carbognano), priest and martyr, who, father of a family, born and ordained in the Armenian Church, suffered a lot for having maintained and propagated firmly the Catholic faith professed by the Council of Chalcedon and he finally died beheaded while reciting the Nicene Creed." (Roman Martyrology}

References 

1656 births
1707 deaths
18th-century Eastern Catholic martyrs
Armenian Catholic Church in Turkey
Armenian Catholic priests
Armenians from the Ottoman Empire
Beatifications by Pope Pius XI
Catholic saints
Christians executed for refusing to convert to Islam
Christian martyrs executed by decapitation
Christian saints killed by Muslims
Converts to Eastern Catholicism from Oriental Orthodoxy
Eastern Catholic beatified people